The Second Yamagata Cabinet is the ninth Cabinet of Japan led by Yamagata Aritomo from November 8, 1898, to October 19, 1900.

Cabinet

References 

Cabinet of Japan
1898 establishments in Japan
Cabinets established in 1898
Cabinets disestablished in 1900